This is a list of notable painters from, or associated with, Georgia.

A
Merab Abramishvili (1957-2006)
David Alexidze (born 1966)
Elene Akhvlediani (1898-1975)
Alexander (Sandro) Antadze (born 1972)

B
Alexander Bazhbeuk-Melikyan (1891-1966)
Lavinia Bazhbeuk-Melikyan (1922-2005)
Gia Bugadze (born 1956)

D
Guram Dolenjashvili (born 1943)

E
Robert Elibekyan (born 1941)

G
Gigo Gabashvili (1862-1936)
Lado Gudiashvili (1896-1980)
Gia Gugushvili (born 1952)

H
Henryk Hryniewski (1869-1937)

J
Ucha Japaridze (1906-1988)

K
David Kakabadze (1889-1952)
Gayane Khachaturian (1942-2009)
Shalva Kikodze (1894-1921)
Sergo Kobuladze (1909-1978)

L 
Levan Lagidze (born 1958)

M
Grigol Maisuradze (1817-1885)
Nana Meskhidze (1936-1997)
Shota and Margarita Metreveli (1913-1983, 1913-1984)

O
Irakli Ochiauri (1924-2015)

P
Rusudan Petviashvili (born 1968)
Niko Pirosmani (1862-1918)

S
Lado Seidishvili (1931-2010)
Dimitri Shevardnadze (1885-1937)
Valerian Sidamon-Eristavi (1889-1943)

T
Mamuka Tavakalashvili
Radish Tordia (born 1936)
Zurab Tsereteli (born 1934)

V
Avto Varazi (1926-1977)

 
Georgian painters
Painters